William C. Friend (born July 14, 1949) is an American politician who served as a member of the Indiana House of Representatives from 1992 to 2018. In January 2018, Friend announced that he would not be running for reelection.

Education
Friend graduated from North Miami High School in 1967. He has a Bachelor of Science degree in biology from the University of Indianapolis.

Career
He previously served as Allen Township Trustee/Assessor, a member of the Miami County Council, and Miami County Auditor.

Friend has served in the Indiana House of Representatives since 1992. He is currently House Majority Leader. His district includes parts of Elkhart, Fulton, Kosciusko, Marshall and Miami Counties. He serves on the Agriculture and Rural Development committees.

Personal life
Friend lives in Macy, Indiana with his wife, Ann Friend. They have three children and two grandchildren.

References

External links
Official Indiana State Legislature site

1949 births
21st-century American politicians
County auditors in the United States
County commissioners in Indiana
Living people
Republican Party members of the Indiana House of Representatives
People from Miami County, Indiana
University of Indianapolis alumni